The Victorian Certificate of Applied Learning (VCAL) is a 'hands-on' option for students in Years 10, 11, and 12 and is a credential awarded to secondary school students who successfully complete year 11 and 12 in the Australian State of Victoria since 2002. The VCAL gives students practical work-related experience, as well as literacy and numeracy skills and the opportunity to build personal skills that are important for life and work. Like the Victorian Certificate of Education (VCE), VCAL is an accredited senior secondary school qualification.  

Further information in regards to attaining a VCAL can be found on than the Victorian Curriculum and Assessment Authority. 

VCAL is a practical education stream, where students may work in a trade or part-time job on some days of the week and supplement this by doing a set course at school.

In 2012, the Victorian Liberal/National Coalition, under the leadership of Ted Baillieu made large funding cuts (over $300m) to the TAFE public education system, a major deliverer of VCAL courses for the youth and mature aged students, and cut funding to Secondary school VCAL programs.  This resulted in students being unable to access many courses and job losses for VCAL providers for secondary schools.

Cancellation 
In 2020, it was announced that the VCAL after 18 years  will be merged with VCE; phasing out of the  program beginning in 2022 and then  wholly 'scrapped' by 2025. Education Minister James Merlino stated that a 'single VCE certificate would make it easier for students to get a range of skills, both academic and vocational.', with the suspension of VCAL also in response to the stigma that it is solely for non-academic students.  The VCAL will  be replaced by the Victorian Pathways Certificate & the Victorian Certificate of Education (Vocational Major) from 2023.

See also 
 Department of Education and Early Childhood Development (Victoria)
 Victorian Curriculum and Assessment Authority

References

External links
 Victorian Curriculum and Assessment Authority, VCAA VCAL - Victorian Certificate of Applied Learning
 Department of Education and Early Childhood Development (Victoria) website

Education in Victoria (Australia)
School qualifications